John MacFarlane (1823 – 10 April 1880) was a member of the Queensland Legislative Assembly.

Biography
MacFarlane was born in Glasgow, Scotland, the son of David Macfarlane and his wife Margaret (née Gibb). He arrived in Victoria around 1840 where he engaged in Squatting pursuits. In 1865 he moved to Queensland and as a member of a Victorian firm, took up Oakey Creek run on the Mackenzie River in Central Queensland. Like most stations in the area it proved unsuitable for sheep and after four years he moved to Rockhampton where he established a successful stock and station agent.

He died of diabetes in April 1880 and was buried in the South Rockhampton Cemetery.

Public career
MacFarlane was an alderman in Rockhampton from 1874 until 1880 including being the mayor from 1876–1878. He entered state politics as the member for Rockhampton in 1877 following the resignation of Charles Buzacott. He resigned from the assembly a year later but in 1879 he became the member for Leichhardt and held the seat until his death in 1880.

References

Members of the Queensland Legislative Assembly
1823 births
1880 deaths
19th-century Australian politicians
Australian stock and station agents
19th-century Australian businesspeople